, also known as , was the second president of what is now Nintendo Co., Ltd., from 1929 to 1949. He married the daughter of Fusajiro Yamauchi, Tei Yamauchi, and took the Yamauchi surname. Kaneda retired in 1949 after suffering a stroke, leaving Nintendo to be run by his grandson, Hiroshi Yamauchi.

Career
Kaneda married Fusajiro Yamauchi's daughter, Tei, and based on Japanese adult adoption rules, he took the Yamauchi surname on the same day in order to inherit Nintendo. Fusajiro Yamauchi retired in 1929, making Kaneda Nintendo's second president.

When Kaneda took over Nintendo, he was in charge of Japan's largest card maker. In 1933, he established a joint venture company, and renamed it Yamauchi Nintendo and Co. The same year, Kaneda built a new headquarters building. In 1947, he established a distribution company, Marufuku Company Limited, that would carry Western-style playing cards. During his tenure, Kaneda strove to make the company more driven and efficientintroducing an assembly line, creating a hierarchy of management that competed with each other on performance, and advancing the playing card business.

He suffered a stroke in 1948 and retired in 1949. Near death, he quickly recruited his 21-year-old grandson, Hiroshi Yamauchi, to quit college and inherit the family business. Hiroshi Yamauchi's father, Shikanojo Inaba, had forfeited inheritance because he had abandoned his family when Yamauchi was five years old.

References 

1883 births
1951 deaths
20th-century Japanese businesspeople
Playing card manufacturers
Chief executives in retail
Entertainment industry businesspeople
Hanafuda manufacturers
Japanese chairpersons of corporations
Japanese company founders
Nintendo people
Retail company founders